Banarus Muhammad Khan (born 31 August 1969) is a Pakistani athlete. He competed in the men's triple jump at the 1992 Summer Olympics. He also competed in both the long jump and the triple jump at the 1993 World Championships in Athletics in Stuttgart, Germany.

References

1969 births
Living people
Athletes (track and field) at the 1992 Summer Olympics
Pakistani male triple jumpers
Olympic athletes of Pakistan
Place of birth missing (living people)